Lech Łasko (born 2 June 1956) is a Polish former volleyball player, a member of the Poland national team from 1975 to 1984. He won a gold medal at the Olympic Games Montreal 1976.

Personal life
His son, Michał was also a volleyball player.

Honours

Clubs
 National championships
 1979/1980  Polish Championship, with Gwardia Wrocław
 1980/1981  Polish Cup, with Gwardia Wrocław
 1980/1981  Polish Championship, with Gwardia Wrocław
 1981/1982  Polish Championship, with Gwardia Wrocław

References

External links
 
 
 Player profile at Volleybox.net

1956 births
Living people
People from Świdnik
Polish men's volleyball players
Olympic volleyball players of Poland
Volleyball players at the 1976 Summer Olympics
Volleyball players at the 1980 Summer Olympics
Olympic medalists in volleyball
Olympic gold medalists for Poland
Medalists at the 1976 Summer Olympics
Gwardia Wrocław players
Polish expatriate sportspeople in Italy
Expatriate volleyball players in Italy